Kenneth A. Symington of Cañal was a British-Cuban civic leader, the last National Executive Commissioner of the Asociación de Scouts de Cuba.

Professionally he was a chemical engineer for Industria Sanitarios Nacional, S.A. in San José de las Lajas. He was also a Rotarian.

Publications
"Caverns of St. Tomas", Antonio Nunez Jimenez and Kenneth A. Symington, Bulletin of the National Speleological Society - ISSN 0146-9517 Number 17: 2-7 - December 1955
Hypomnemata: Stories, Fables, Memories, Kenneth A. Symington, Xlibris, April 15, 2010

External links

http://www.caves.org/pub/journal/PDF/V17/v17-Jimenez.htm

Year of birth missing
Possibly living people
Scouting and Guiding in Cuba